Chad Alexander Archer (born 27 May 1970) is an American-born Australian musician.  Archer is best known for his violin work in the Fremantle based Alt country/rock band The Kill Devil Hills.

Early life
Archer was born in Seattle, Washington, US. He was raised in Darrington, Washington, and graduated from Darrington High School in 1988.

Career
As well as performing and recording three albums with Kill Devil Hills, Archer has performed and recorded with various Australian artists, most notably Abbe May and also with Felicity Groom.

In 2010, Archer was named best instrumentalist at the WAMi Awards. In 2012 he performed at the Rock-It Festival.

Discography

The Kill Devil Hills (2003–present) 
 Heathen Songs – Torn and Frayed/Reverberation (2004)
 The Drought – Torn and Frayed/Shock (TORNCD16) (7 October 2006)
 Man, You Should Explode – Torn and Frayed/Shock (TORNCD24) (25 September 2009)

Abbe May
Abbe May and the Rockin Pneumonia 2009, EP.

References 

1970 births
Australian musicians
Living people